Tomaini is a surname. Notable people with the surname include:

Al Tomaini (1912–1962), American circus performer, once the world's tallest person
Army Tomaini (1918–2005), American football player, brother of Johnny
Johnny Tomaini (1902–1985), American football player